The Bélier class, sometimes called the Cerbère class, was a class of four battleship rams built for the French Navy in the 1870s. Designed to have an offensive coast guard role, they rarely left their home port during their career and were the last of their type.

They had wooden hulls with an iron ram and upper works. Funnels were side by side on all four ships. Although Cerbère was originally rigged for sail (brig configuration), they were discarded and the remaining three ships of the class were completed without sails.

Bélier was commissioned at Cherbourg in 1872, remaining there throughout its career, successively commanded by Commanders Didot, Courbet, Pouthier, Bonamy de Villemerenil and Riou de Kerprigent and was scrapped in 1896.

Bouledogue was commissioned at Lorient in 1873. Commanded by the Captains of the vessel Franquet, Schwerer, Massenet and Schlumberger, it became the centerpiece of the mobile defense of the port of Lorient in 1886 and was scrapped on 24 April 1896.

Cerbère was commissioned in Brest in 1868, commanded by Chaxel. Commanded by Galiber, Cerbère moved berth to Cherbourg in 1870, leaving for Le Havre in August 1870, commanded by Carrade. From 1873 Cerbère was commanded by Bailloud, then Cahagne and finally Riou de Kerprigent before being scrapped on 12 November 1886.

Le Tigre, commissioned at Rochefort in 1874 under Jouneau's command, was berthed at Brest, traveled regularly to Cherbourg and was finally scrapped on 13 February 1892.

Ships

References

Sources
 
 

Ship classes of the French Navy
Ships built in France